Twenty Years of Rascal Flatts: The Greatest Hits is the second greatest hits album by country music group Rascal Flatts. It was released on October 2, 2020, through Big Machine Records and features twenty of the group's biggest hits, including thirteen of their number one singles.

Track listing

Chart performance

Weekly charts

Year-end charts

References

Rascal Flatts albums
2020 greatest hits albums
Lyric Street Records albums
Big Machine Records albums